Gornji Lapac is a village in Croatia.

Population

According to the 2011 census, Gornji Lapac had 57 inhabitants.

Note: Gornji Lapac was independent settlement till 1948, then part of settlement (hamlet) of the settlement of Gajine, and then from 1981 independent settlement again.

1991 census 

According to the 1991 census, settlement of Gornji Lapac had 194 inhabitants, which were ethnically declared as this:

Austro-hungarian 1910 census 

According to the 1910 census, settlement of Gornji Lapac had 385 inhabitants in 2 hamlets, which were linguistically and religiously declared as this:

Literature 

  Savezni zavod za statistiku i evidenciju FNRJ i SFRJ, popis stanovništva 1948, 1953, 1961, 1971, 1981. i 1991. godine.
 Knjiga: "Narodnosni i vjerski sastav stanovništva Hrvatske, 1880-1991: po naseljima, autor: Jakov Gelo, izdavač: Državni zavod za statistiku Republike Hrvatske, 1998., ;

References

Populated places in Lika-Senj County